Lanahassee Creek is a stream in the U.S. state of Georgia. It is a tributary to Kinchafoonee Creek.

Lanahassee is a name taken from the Muskogee language which most likely means "rancid yellow water". Variant spellings are "Lanahasee Creek", "Lannahasee Creek", and "Lannahassee Creek".

References

Rivers of Georgia (U.S. state)
Rivers of Marion County, Georgia